Fluorexetamine (3'-Fluoro-2-oxo-PCE, FXE) is a recreational designer drug from the arylcyclohexylamine family, with dissociative effects. Effects are slightly more stimulating than regular ketamine. Still produces analgesic effects with stimulating dissociative effects. Has reportedly been sold over the internet since around 2017, though has remained relatively uncommon.

See also 
 3-Fluoro-PCP
 2-Fluorodeschloroketamine
 3-Fluorodeschloroketamine
 Deoxymethoxetamine
 Hydroxetamine
 Methoxetamine
 MXiPr

References 

Arylcyclohexylamines
Designer drugs
Dissociative drugs
Fluoroarenes